Silverdale  may refer to:

Place names
Australia
 Silverdale, New South Wales
* Silverdale, Queensland
Canada
 Silverdale, British Columbia
India
 Silverdale, Coonoor
New Zealand
 Silverdale, Auckland
 Silverdale, Hamilton
United Kingdom
 Silverdale, Lancashire
 Silverdale, Nottingham
Silverdale, North Yorkshire, a dale
 Silverdale, Staffordshire 
United States
 Silverdale, Indiana
 Silverdale, Kansas
 Silverdale Township, Cowley County, Kansas
 Silverdale, Minnesota
 Silverdale, Pennsylvania
 Silverdale, Washington

Other
 Silverdale (limestone), commercial building and sculpture stone quarried from the Fort Riley Limestone, Kansas, USA
 Silverdale Formation, a Miocene geologic unit in North Carolina, USA
 Silverdale Detention Center, Tennessee, USA
 Silverdale School, Sheffield, United Kingdom